Brucemacfaddenia is an extinct genus of interatheriine notoungulates that lived during the Late Oligocene in what is now Bolivia. Fossils of this genus have been found in the Salla Formation of Bolivia.

Etymology 
The genus name, Brucemacfaddenia, refers to Bruce MacFadden, known for his significant contributions of Cenozoic mammal evolution in Bolivia. paleontology. The specific name, boliviensis, refers to Bolivia, the country where it was found in.

Description 
Brucemacfaddenia was a small-sized interatheriid. The derived features of Brucemacfaddenia that set it apart from other basal interatheriines such as Proargyrohyrax and Santiagorothia, by having hypselodont cheek teeth an completely persistent lingual sulcus on the upper molars. Its deciduous upper detention had thin enamel.

Taxonomy 
Brucemacfaddenia was first described in 2008 based on remains found in the Salla Formation, in the La Paz Department, Bolivia, dating to the Late Oligocene, around 29 to 23 mya. It was described alongside another interatheriid, Federicoanaya sallaensis. It is a basal member of the Interatheriidae family, more specifically within the subfamily Interatheriinae.

The following cladogram of the Interatheriinae is based on Vera et al. 2017, showing the position of Brucemacfaddenia.

References 

Typotheres
Prehistoric placental genera
Oligocene mammals of South America
Paleogene Bolivia
Fossils of Bolivia
Deseadan
Fossil taxa described in 2008